Richard Foley may refer to:

Richard Foley (ironmaster) (1580–1657), English ironmaster
Richard Foley (politician) (1681–1732), English lawyer and MP for Droitwich
Richie Foley, Irish hurler
Rick Foley, Canadian ice hockey player
Richard T. Foley, discoverer of the Richard T. Foley Site, an archaeological site

See also

Richie Foley, fictional character in Gear (Static Shock)